Clair Obscur is a 1988 film directed by Bashar Shbib.

References

External links 
 

1988 films
1988 drama films
Films directed by Bashar Shbib
Canadian drama films
French-language Canadian films
1980s English-language films
1980s Canadian films